HMS Wild Goose, pennant number U45, was a  sloop of the Royal Navy. She was one of several ships of that class that took part in the famous "six in one trip" in 1943 (in which six U-boats were sunk in one patrol).

Service history
She was built at Yarrow shipyards in Scotstoun, Glasgow. She was launched on 14 October 1942. She was adopted by the civil community of Worsley, Lancashire, as part of the Warship Week savings campaign in 1942.

On 18 December 1943, she was taken in hand for repair in Liverpool, redeploying at the end of January 1944.

At the end of May 1944, she returned to Liverpool for more repairs, whilst here she was selected to take part in Operation Neptune to prevent U-Boat attacks on the D-Day invasion convoys. On 1 July 1944, she was released from Neptune and dispatched to Belfast for refit, completing in September 1944.

Following VE day, on 6 May 1945, she was nominated for transfer to the British Pacific Fleet following her second refit. By the time the refit had completed in September 1945 the Japanese had surrendered and Wild Goose was therefore surplus to requirements and was Paid off and reduced to reserve status.

She was later recommissioned in 1946 and deployed to the Persian Gulf, spending the rest of her service career in the Middle East before finally decommissioning in 1955.

Wild Goose was sold for breaking up in February 1956, and arrived at the breakers at Bo’ness on the Firth of Forth near Edinburgh on 26 February 1956.

Today
The ship's badge was saved from the breakers yard and donated to Liverpool National Maritime Museum.

References

Publications

External links
 Mike Kemble's Walker site
 Naval-History.net HMS Wild Goose

 

Black Swan-class sloops
World War II sloops of the United Kingdom
Sloops of the United Kingdom
Ships built on the River Clyde
1942 ships